Glen Echo Park is a village in St. Louis County, Missouri, United States. The population was 160 at the 2010 census. The community took its name from the  Glen Echo Country Club.

Geography

Demographics

2010 census
As of the census of 2010, there were 160 people, 57 households, and 37 families living in the village. The racial makeup of the village was 8.1% White and 91.9% African American. Hispanic or Latino of any race were 1.3% of the population.

There were 57 households, of which 26.3% had children under the age of 18 living with them, 40.4% were married couples living together, 15.8% had a female householder with no husband present, 8.8% had a male householder with no wife present, and 35.1% were non-families. 28.1% of all households were made up of individuals, and 10.6% had someone living alone who was 65 years of age or older. The average household size was 2.81 and the average family size was 3.54.

The median age in the village was 41 years. 21.2% of residents were under the age of 18; 10.7% were between the ages of 18 and 24; 23.8% were from 25 to 44; 25.7% were from 45 to 64; and 18.8% were 65 years of age or older. The gender makeup of the village was 45.0% male and 55.0% female.

2000 census
As of the census of 2000, there were 166 people, 63 households, and 50 families living in the village. The racial makeup of the village was 11.45% White, 87.95% African American and 0.60% Native American. Hispanic or Latino of any race were 0.60% of the population.

There were 63 households, out of which 28.6% had children under the age of 18 living with them, 55.6% were married couples living together, 19.0% had a female householder with no husband present, and 20.6% were non-families. 19.0% of all households were made up of individuals, and none had someone living alone who was 65 years of age or older. The average household size was 2.63 and the average family size was 3.02.

In the village, the population was spread out, with 25.9% under the age of 18, 4.2% from 18 to 24, 22.3% from 25 to 44, 31.3% from 45 to 64, and 16.3% who were 65 years of age or older. The median age was 44 years. For every 100 females, there were 104.9 males. For every 100 females age 18 and over, there were 92.2 males.

The median income for a household in the village was $71,250, and the median income for a family was $80,833. Males had a median income of $62,917 versus $40,417 for females. The per capita income for the village was $24,564. None of the population or families were below the poverty line.

Police services
Police service is provided by the neighboring city of Normandy.

References

Villages in St. Louis County, Missouri
Villages in Missouri